Sara Cetinja (born 16 April 2000) is a Serbian professional footballer who plays as a goalkeeper for Italian Serie A club Pomigliano CF and the Serbia women's national team.

Club career
On 12 February 2014 Cetinja signed her first contract with national champions ŽFK Spartak Subotica, following seven years in the youth teams at FK „Prof. Bolesnikov“. She made her Serbian Women's Super League debut for the club on 31 August 2015.

In October 2020, Cetinja transferred to AS Nancy Lorraine of the French Division 2 Féminine. She made two league appearances, before the club requested its own demotion to the regional categories at the end of the season.

On 27 July 2021, it was announced that Cetinja had moved from Nancy to newly-promoted Serie A club Pomigliano.

International career
Cetinja made her first appearance for the senior Serbia women's national football team on 17 June 2019, in a 3–2 friendly win over Romania at the headquarters of the Football Association of Serbia at Stara Pazova.

In October 2021, Cetinja played the full match as a Serbia team depleted by injuries and COVID-19 lost their 2023 FIFA Women's World Cup qualifier 2–1 to Portugal at Estádio do Bonfim in Setúbal.

References

External links
 

2000 births
Living people
Serbian women's footballers
Serbian expatriate footballers
Serbian expatriate sportspeople in Italy
Serbia women's international footballers
Expatriate women's footballers in Italy
Expatriate women's footballers in France
Serbian expatriate sportspeople in France
ŽFK Spartak Subotica players
Women's association football goalkeepers
ŽFK Crvena zvezda players
Pomigliano C.F. players
Serie A (women's football) players
Footballers from Novi Sad